Absolute monarchy in France slowly emerged in the 16th century and became firmly established during the 17th century. Absolute monarchy is a variation of the governmental form of monarchy in which the monarch holds supreme authority and where that authority is not restricted by any written laws, legislature, or customs. In France, Louis XIV was the most famous exemplar of absolute monarchy, with his court central to French political and cultural life during his reign. It ended in May 1789, when widespread social distress led to the convocation of the Estates-General, which was converted into a National Assembly in June. The Assembly passed a series of radical measures, including the abolition of feudalism, state control of the Catholic Church and extending the right to vote.

Introduction

The 16th century was strongly influenced by religious conflicts that developed out of the Reformation. France's precarious position created ideal conditions for the formation and justification of absolute monarchy. Its disputes between monarchy and community as well as the fatal loss of the House of Valois' authority during the second half of the 16th century prompted theoretical reflections that led to the consolidation of the monarchy's power.

Establishing absolute monarchy in France 

By the early 9th century, the efficient administration of Charlemagne's Empire was ensured by high-level civil servants, carrying the, then non-hereditary, titles of counts (in charge of a County), marquis (in charge of a March), dukes (military commanders), etc. During the course of the 9th and 10th centuries, continually threatened by Viking invasions, France became a very decentralised state: the nobility's titles and lands became hereditary, and the authority of the king became more religious than secular and thus was less effective and constantly challenged by powerful noblemen. Thus was established feudalism in France. Over time, some of the king's vassals would grow so powerful that they often posed a threat to the king.

Since then, French kings had continuously tried to strengthen existing royal powers scattered among their nobles. Philip the Fair, Charles the Wise and Louis the Cunning were instrumental in the transformation of France from a feudal state to a modern country. By the time of Francis I, France was a very centralized state but the French Wars of Religion posed a new threat to royal absolutism with quasi-independent Protestant strongholds developing in various locations in the country.

With his skillful Prime Minister Richelieu, who vowed "to make the royal power supreme in France and France supreme in Europe." (source: Cardinal Richelieu's Political Testament), Louis XIII established Absolute Monarchy in France during his reign. When his son and successor Louis XIV came to power, a period of trouble known as the Fronde occurred in France, taking advantage of Louis XIV's minority. This rebellion was driven by the great feudal lords and sovereign courts as a reaction to the rise of royal power in France.

The rebellion was crushed; however, many obstacles stood in the way of absolutism in France:
Nobles had the means to raise private armies and build fortifications. The king did not have the means to raise and keep an army himself and had to rely on these nobles to defend the nation;
Lesser nobles, who had the ability to read and write, also acted as the king's agents. Effectively, they were his representatives of government to the people. They collected taxes, posted edicts, and administered justice. 
The Huguenots, who since the 1598 Edict of Nantes by Henry IV, held the rights to bear arms and to build fortifications in certain locations.

To overcome these obstacles King Louis XIV adopted several measures to weaken or eliminate competing centers of power:

The Edict of Fontainebleau in 1685 removed the former policy of tolerance toward French Huguenots, as formalised by the Edict of Nantes

A more subtle tactic was the demolition of a number of fortified castles still owned and occupied by members of the nobility. This Edict of 1626 was justified as a budgetary reform to reduce maintenance costs by removing obsolete fortifications within the borders of France. While a rational economic step in itself, this measure did have the additional effect of undermining the independence of the aristocracy.

Louis XIV reduced the nobles' power further by requiring them to spend at least some portion of the year as courtiers in residence at the Palace of Versailles. At Versailles, the aristocracy were removed from their provincial power centers and came under the surveillance and control of the royal government. Rather than seen as demeaning, the nobles took required membership of the royal court to be a high honor. Nobles, being granted residence at Versailles, were generally prepared to give up their former duties as royal representatives outside Paris. Louis XIV, with the help of his minister of finance, Jean-Baptiste Colbert, replaced them with royal appointees drawn largely from the merchant class, who were generally better educated and whose titles were revocable and not hereditary.

Consequences

The final outcome of these acts did centralize the authority of France behind the king. The replacement of government ministers, removal of castles, and other financial policies of Colbert did reduce French national debt considerably.

In the 18th century, however, the relocation of nobles and the sheer obsolescence of Versailles became an important place for a rising merchant class and an instigative press.

Perhaps the most pressing consequence of absolutism in France is the emigration of the Huguenots. Of the merchant class, their emigration effectively led to a brain drain and a loss of tax revenue for France. Moreover, barred from New France, they immigrated to other nations, most notably the Thirteen Colonies, taking their skills of printing, glass making, carpentry, ceramics, a deep belief in the needs for freedom of religion (at least for Protestantism), and the right to bear arms.

The other consequence was a large reduction of the dominating influence of the Kingdom of France in Europe, and a rise in the power of other kingdoms to strengthen their empire, notably in Great Britain, Spain, and the Holy Roman Empire. This caused numerous deadly wars with them (in Europe, America and Africa), some of them won by France or its allies (notably for the independence of the United States), but this caused the loss of most parts of New France (most continental parts in North America, including those that would be sold later to the United States after the end of monarchy in France by the First French Empire, and some islands in the Caribbean), severe degradation of the economic advantage of the first French colonial Empire, accumulation of debts in the kingdom (with a growing influence of the merchants against the French nobility), and a considerable loss of economic, diplomatic, political and cultural influence in Europe, all these being left to the growing British colonial empire (even after its loss of New England) and to its allies all around France in Spain (including the Spanish Netherlands), Austria (including Italy), Nordic countries (and later the United States).

Another consequence of the creation of the United States and of the costly wars between France and all its neighbours in Europe, was also that it initiated lot of severe political and social troubles throughout the kingdom, and it paved the way to the French Revolution and finally the end of the absolute monarchy, via a short step of constitutional monarchy (restoring some parliamentary powers to the Estates General) between 1789 and 1791, and then to the First French Republic (during which the eviction of the traditional French clergy and nobility from the new Constitution further strengthened the military alliance of all European neighbours against France). That lost influence of France was never restored in the following centuries, even after the emergence of the First French Empire (which terminated the dictature, reunited a strongly divided France, restored the freedom of religion, and allowed the reemergence of a stable commercial sector, but also initiated new wars against other monarchies in continental Europe), or after the formation of a new French colonial empire by the Third Republic.

Even today's Fifth Republic in France mimics some models from other European constitutional monarchies, because of the stability and influence of the head of state (monarch or elected president) to preserve the territorial unity by an enforced balance of powers. Unlike past republics, it even accepts and protects constitutionally the presence of nobility, religions or diverse cultures, as plain components and (non absolute) actors of the republic, even if it promotes its own unified system, freely accessible to all its nationals or applicable directly only to its foreign residents.

See also
 Ancien Régime
 Early modern France
 Absolute monarchy
 Autocracy

References

Political history of the Ancien Régime